Symphony No. 4, titled Buddha Dharma or rarely Buddha Dhamma was a symphony made by Vasco Martins in 2001.  It was the first fourth symphony made by a Cape Verdean and the fourth symphony made by a Cape Verdean.  The symphony was inspired by reading a book by Buddha.  He composed it slowly (metronome figure circa 45), the one-piece work took two weeks and was made in and around the island of São Vicente.  The first performance was premiered on September 3, 2001 in São Paulo, Brazil by Lutero Rodrigues and the local cultural symphony (Sinfonia Cultura), its length is 19-20 minutes.  It was performed in France in 2007 and was done by Henri-Claude Fantapié.  This work can be listened via the MP3 format via the website, this was done by the composer.  The symphony is also available on YouTube.  The work covers around 500 sizes and forms about five crescendos.

Orchestra
1 piccolo, flutes, 2 oboes, 2 clarinets, 2 bassoon, contrabassoon (or tuba);
3 horns, 2 C-trumpets, 2 trombones, 1 tuba (of contrabassoon);
1 set of timpani, percussions of symbols from Tibet and Nepal, crotales, glockenspiel, a large drum and a large gong;
violin, violas, celli, double basses

Discography
North Czech Symphony Orchestra of Teplice, as performed by Charles Olivieri-Munroe

External links
Symphony No. 4 Buddha Dharma at vascomartins.com

Compositions by Vasco Martins
2001 compositions
Martines